Concordia is a small town on the French side of the island of Saint Martin in the Caribbean. It lies directly to the south of the French side's capital Marigot. The town has a population of 5,639 residents, as of 2016, making it the third most-populous town on the French side, behind Marigot and Grand Case.

References

Populated places in the Collectivity of Saint Martin